This list of Norwegian women bandy champions shows all champions since the start. Championship for men's teams have been played since 1912, while championship for women's teams have been played since 1984.

The winner of the men's teams championship is given a trophy called kongepokal ("king's cyp"). A kongepokal was also given to the women's teams champions 1986–1995, but has since not been awarded the women champions because of too few participating teams in the championship tournament.

The premier league for women's teams consists of six teams. The top four teams go to a play-off for the championship. The women's championships has been played with teams with fewer players than the regular number of eleven from the official start in 1984, but the number of players has gradually been raised; since 2010 the women's championships is played with nine-player teams.

Norwegian champions

Titles

Number of titles per club
8 Championships
Stabæk (1995, 2003, 2005, 2007, 2010, 2011, 2016, 2017)

6 Championships
Hasle-Løren (1989, 1990, 1991, 1992, 1993, 1994)

 5 Championships 
Bergen (1999, 2000, 2001, 2002, 2006)

4 Championships
Nordre Sande/Drammen (2012, 2013, 2014, 2015)
Vålerengen (1984, 1986, 1987, 1988)

3 Championships
Høvik (1996, 1997, 1998)

2 Championships
Nordre Sande (2008, 2009)

1 Championships
Manglerud Star (1985)
Sagene (2004)

Men's and women's titles the same year

References

Bandy in Norway
Norway